Bruce Cockburn is singer/songwriter Bruce Cockburn's debut album.  The album was originally released in 1970 and is the first album to be released by True North Records. The album received a Canadian gold record award in 1995. For his debut, the artist favors sparse arrangements, consisting primarily of Cockburn on acoustic guitar (and occasional piano and dulcimer) with some support from Dennis Pendrith on bass. The lyrics are introspective in tone, unlike the more politically charged themes Cockburn would explore later in his career.

Track listing
All songs written by Bruce Cockburn.
"Going to the Country" - 3:10
"Thoughts on a Rainy Afternoon" - 3:42
"Together Alone" - 2:42
"Bicycle Trip" - 4:05
"13th Mountain" - 4:45
"Musical Friends" - 2:54
"Change Your Mind" - 2:19
"Man of a Thousand Faces" - 5:40
"Spring Song" - 4:19
"Keep It Open" - 1:40

References

1970 debut albums
Bruce Cockburn albums
True North Records albums
Albums produced by Gene Martynec